This is a list of the 24 members of the European Parliament for the Greece in the 2004 to 2009 session.

List

References

Greece
List
2004